{{Infobox film
| name           = Woh 7 Din
| image          = Woh Saat Din.jpg
| caption        = Poster
| director       = Bapu
| producer       = Surinder KapoorBoney Kapoor
| writer         = Jainendra Jain (dialogue)
| based_on       = {{based on|Andha 7 Naatkal|K. Bhagyaraj}}
| narrator       = 
| starring       = Anil KapoorPadmini KolhapureNaseeruddin Shah
| music          = Laxmikant–Pyarelal
| cinematography = Baba Azmi
| editing        = N. Chandra
| distributor    = S. K. Film Enterprises
| released       = 
| runtime        = 
| country        = India
| language       = Hindi
| budget         = 
}}Woh 7 Din is a 1983 Indian Hindi-language romantic drama film directed by Bapu. Produced by Surinder Kapoor and Boney Kapoor, it stars Anil Kapoor, Padmini Kolhapure and Naseeruddin Shah. It was Anil Kapoor's first lead role in a Hindi movie. The film is a remake of the 1981 Tamil film Andha 7 Naatkal directed by K. Bhagyaraj. The director of this movie Bapu had earlier directed the Telugu version Radha Kalyanam'' (1981).
 The music was done by Laxmikant Pyarelal while Anand Bakshi wrote the lyrics.

Plot 
Maya (played by Padmini Kolhapure) attempts suicide on the day of her nuptial night. Dr. Anand (played by Naseeruddin Shah), Maya's husband, who is a doctor, treats her, and finds out that she attempted suicide. When Maya gains consciousness, she confirms her secret to Dr. Anand: She did not want to get married and was forced.

The story moves to a flashback, where a new singer, Prem (played by Anil Kapoor) and his sidekick Master Raju, come to Maya's house. It is love at first sight for Maya as she falls for the naive, innocent Prem. However, Prem, aspiring to be a true musician, rejects Maya's advances. Furthermore, Prem is in love with Maya but believes that he is not worthy of her. They declare their love for each other, and plan to elope, but destiny has other plans in store for Maya and Prem. On the day of their elopement, the lovers are caught by Maya's parents. As a result, Prem and his sidekick are kicked out of the house and Maya is forced to wed Dr. Anand.

The plot moves to the present, where Dr. Anand confides in her that he only married her due to his ill mother, Savitri (played by Dina Pathak). Dr. Anand promises to unite the two lovers after his mother's death. During the time of her stay, Maya gets attached to Dr. Anand's daughter (played by Suchita Trivedi). Meanwhile, Dr. Anand searches for and finds Prem. When his mother dies, Dr. Anand reunites Prem and Maya. However, his attempts remain fruitless, as Maya refuses to leave Dr. Anand. Maya realizes the strength behind their marriage and does not budge. Prem leaves Dr. Anand and Maya, stating that this is deviance in the eyes of society.

Cast 
 Anil Kapoor as Prem Pratap Singh 
 Padmini Kolhapure as Maya
 Naseeruddin Shah as Dr. Anand
 Satish Kaushik as Kishan
 Nilu Phule as Maya's Nana
 Jagdeep as Ganga Prasad
 Raju Shrestha as Chhotu
 Dina Pathak as Savitri 
 Ashalata Wabgaonkar as Maya's Mother
 Suchita Trivedi as Dr. Anand's Daughter

Music 
Lyrics: Anand Bakshi

"Pyar Kiya Nahi Jata Ho Jata Hai" – Lata Mangeshkar, Shabbir Kumar
"Anari Ka Khelna Khel Ka Satiyanas" – Asha Bhosle
"Kangana Oye Hoye Kangana" – Lata Mangeshkar, Shabbir Kumar
"Mere Dil Se Dillagi Na Kar, Dil Dhadk Gaya Toh Kya Hoga" –  Kishore Kumar, Anuradha Paudwal
"Payaliya" – Suresh Wadkar, Kavita Krishnamurthy

References

External links 
 
 

1983 films
1980s Hindi-language films
Films directed by Bapu
Hindi remakes of Tamil films
Indian romantic drama films
Films scored by Laxmikant–Pyarelal
1983 romantic drama films